Marion T. Anderson (November 13, 1839 - February 7, 1904) was an American soldier who received the Medal of Honor for valor during the American Civil War.

Biography
Anderson served in the American Civil War in Company D, 51st Indiana Infantry for the Union Army. He received the Medal of Honor on September 1, 1893.  He was a Companion of the District of Columbia Commandery of the Military Order of the Loyal Legion of the United States.

Medal of Honor citation
Citation:

Led his regiment over 5 lines of the enemy's works, where he fell, severely wounded.

See also

 List of American Civil War Medal of Honor recipients: A–F

References

External links
 
 Military Times

1839 births
1904 deaths
Union Army soldiers
United States Army Medal of Honor recipients
People of Indiana in the American Civil War
People from Decatur County, Indiana
American Civil War recipients of the Medal of Honor
Burials at Arlington National Cemetery